Lewis E. Eliason (September 15, 1850 – May 2, 1919) was an American politician who served as the fifth Lieutenant Governor of Delaware, from January 16, 1917, until his death on May 2, 1919. A Democrat, he served under Republican Governor John G. Townsend, Jr., as the two offices were elected independently at the time.

He remains the state's only lieutenant governor to die in office.

References

External links
 Delaware's Lieutenant Governors

Lieutenant Governors of Delaware
1850 births
1919 deaths
19th-century American politicians
Delaware Democrats